Sagittula stellata is a lignin-transforming bacterium, the type species of its genus. It is Gram-negative and rod-shaped,  does not form spores, and is strictly aerobic. The type strain is E-37 (= ATCC 700073).

References

Further reading

External links
LPSN
Type strain of Sagittula stellata at BacDive -  the Bacterial Diversity Metadatabase

Rhodobacteraceae
Bacteria described in 1997